Bjørn Stenersen (9 February 1970 – 16 September 1998) was a Norwegian professional racing cyclist.

He won the Norwegian National Road Race Championship in 1990. He also competed in two events at the 1992 Summer Olympics, placing eleventh in the team time trial.

He was the brother of Karsten Stenersen.

Major results

1987
 1st  Time trial, National Junior Road Championships
1988
 1st  Time trial, National Junior Road Championships
1989
 1st  Time trial, National Road Championships
1990
 1st  Road race, National Road Championships
 2nd Overall Rheinland-Pfalz-Rundfahrt
 3rd Grand Prix de France
 8th Overall Tour of Norway
1991
 1st  Time trial, National Road Championships
 2nd Overall Tour of Norway
1st Stages 2 & 6
 2nd Grand Prix de la Ville de Lillers
 3rd  Team time trial, UCI Road World Championships
1992
 1st  Time trial, National Road Championships
 2nd Overall Tour of Norway
1st Stage 5
1993
 6th Grand Prix Impanis-Van Petegem
 8th Paris–Bourges
1997
 6th Grand Prix Herning

References

External links
 

1970 births
1998 deaths
Norwegian male cyclists
Sportspeople from Bergen
Cyclists at the 1992 Summer Olympics
Olympic cyclists of Norway